Maria Katrina Iren Pe Halili (born January 4, 1986) is a Filipino actress and commercial model  of Chinese descent. She made her screen debut through the reality talent search StarStruck in 2003, and became more popular playing several roles, initially as the main antagonist in several television dramas, the most prominent being Majika (2006), the first Philippine remake of Marimar (2007), the second television adaptation of Darna (2009), Destiny Rose (2015) and The Stepdaughters (2018). Her effectiveness in portraying villain roles would later earn her the moniker Primera Kontrabida of the Philippines in 2017. She would later portray protagonist and antiheroine roles in other shows and films, including One Night Only (2008), Magdusa Ka (2008), Niño (2014), Prima Donnas (2019) and Unica Hija (2022). She is also known for her appearances in the GMA drama anthology Magpakailanman.

Background
Katrina Halili is an alumna of the StarStruck talent search and the cover girl of magazines such as FHM and Maxim Philippines. She was voted as FHM Philippines''' sexiest woman for the year 2006 and in 2007. She is the first StarStruck contestant to top the FHM Philippines' 100 Sexiest list and the first Filipina celebrity to have won the title twice in a row. She is a four-time FHM covergirl (2005, 2006, 2008 and 2015). With 123,000 votes, she placed 2nd in 2008.

She gave birth to her daughter named Katrence Lawrence Halili Cadevida on September 18, 2012.

She showed support for 2022 presidential candidate Bongbong Marcos through 2 Instagram posts.

Drama roles
Halili started her first soap drama way back 2004 (Forever in My Heart) where she played Janelle Bernabe, the antagonist to the character of Jennylyn Mercado. Since then she played supervillain roles in two famous GMA fantaserye, Darna and Majika. In April 2007, she was one of the main cast in Lupin, where she played a good character, Ashley Calibre. However the same year she was pulled out from the show to play the famous villainous role of Senyora Angelika Santibañez in the remake of Marimar, but the character was changed into a young who will compete with Marimar for Sergio's love and extremely ruthless character, this is also her first pure evil role as she killed many people in the series compared to her past roles as she only committed attempted murder. This made Katrina more famous as she was given her first lead role after Marimar this was the 2008 Magdusa Ka, she portrayed Christine, a headstrong waitress and prostitute who turns out to be a rich lass but was opposed by the evil Millet (played by Iwa Moto). Katrina said she was challenge for her new role because she always played heartless characters in the past.

In the same year, she was given another lead role in Gagambino. But in May 2009, she was involved in a controversy surrounding a leaked video of her then partner, forcing her to temporarily go on hiatus from the showbiz industry. In June 2009, she returns to acting to play the villain role of Fedra Perez in Rosalinda. 

 2009–2010: Darna, Langit sa Piling Mo, Beauty Queen 
In 2009, Halili was given another antagonist role in Darna, she played Serpina, a snake woman and one of the primary rival of Darna. Next is Langit sa Piling Mo, she played another main antagonist role as the scheming and manipulative Aurora. She later played a villainous protagonist role in Beauty Queen. In Kaya ng Powers, she played an ex-syndicate member.

2011–2012
In 2011, she rose to fame again as she played the role of Lynette in Munting Heredera, again she is the main antagonist of the series but later was killed. In 2012, she once again played a villain role as Emmie in My Beloved. She reunited with Marimar (2007) lead casts, Marian Rivera and Dingdong Dantes. Halili's character in this series is similar to her obsessed and murderous Angelika character in 2007 Marimar. However Halili and Rivera has another feud when Katrina started tweeting, she wanted to kill Emmie's character because someone is insecure and hateful to her. She said that this person also hated her five years ago.

2013–present: Villainous and protagonist roles
In 2013, Halili played two main antagonist roles in two TV series, in Indio, she played the goddess of greed who wanted to kill the protagonist of the series. Another series is Magkano Ba ang Pag-ibig?, she played Margot, the scheming and hard-hearted sister of Lualhati who killed her mother out of anger, she also hated Eloisa.

In 2014, she played a protagonist role, a good character role in Niño as Hannah. In 2015, she played a villain role in The Rich Man's Daughter. Later Katrina Halili played the main villain role as Jasmine in Destiny Rose, Jasmine is the evil cousin of Joey who made his life miserable as hell. In the finale episode Jasmine tried to kill Joey/Destiny Rose by burning him but failed.

Later in 2016, Halili played another main antagonist role in Sa Piling ni Nanay as Scarlet, the socialite evil mother of Katherine who tried to kill Ysabel and even her daughter as a revenge. Scarlet is the one who killed Matilda and many characters. She is also the source of Ysabel's misfortune. She is a wicked mother as she uses her daughter to usurp the Mercado family's wealth and never loved Katherine.

In 2017, Katrina played another main antagonist role in D' Originals as Yvette, the social climber sexy-tary-turned-mistress of Lando who tried to kill Lando and Josie because of her vengeance. Although Yvette is the one who started the fight as she uses Lando to usurp his wealth and brutally confront the legal wife, Josie. Jaclyn Jose played protagonist Josie who also played the antagonist role of Senyõra Angelica Santibañez in the 2015 Marimar, which was originally played by Halili in 2007.

In February 2018, Katrina played the main villain role of Isabelle in The Stepdaughters, Isabelle hates Mayumi from the start and does many evil things to her including her loved ones. Isabelle also killed her unborn half-sister and tried to kill her own father and orchestrated kidnappings and serial murders in the series. In the end she kidnaps Mayumi and tries to kill her by burning her face but failed.

In November 2018, Halili joined the series Pamilya Roces, she played Maisa, the villainous daughter of Virgil, a seductive and ruthless serial killer who wants revenge for her mother's death.

In 2019, she played her first anti-hero role in TODA One I Love where she played Georgina, a mysterious rich character who hates the evil Mayora Dyna and plotted to kill her husband. Georgina firstly appeared as a cold-hearted and seductive woman but in reality she is kind and was a victim of the latter's cruelty as Dyna and the Generoso's killed her father. Now she helps Gelay to stop Mayora's evil things and expose her secrets. She later played another protagonist role in Prima Donnas as Lillian Madreal, the surrogate mother of the triplets, Mayi, Ella, and Lenlen.

Filmography
Television

Films

 Accolades 

|-
| 2006 || rowspan="2" | Katrina Halili || rowspan="2" | FHM Philippines Sexiest Woman || 
|-
| 2007 || 
|-
| rowspan="2" | 2018 || Mga Anak ng Kamote || 3rd ToFarm Film Festival Best Actress || 
|-
| The Stepdaughters'' || 32nd PMPC Star Awards for Television Best Drama Actress || 
|-
|}

References

External links
 

StarStruck (Philippine TV series) participants
1986 births
21st-century Filipino actresses
Filipino child actresses
Filipino film actresses
Filipino television actresses
Living people
People from Quezon City
Filipino female models
Filipina gravure idols
Actresses from Quezon
Filipino people of Chinese descent